The 1997 AFL season was the 101st season of the Australian Football League (AFL), the highest level senior Australian rules football competition in Australia, which was known as the Victorian Football League until 1989. The season ran from 27 March until 27 September, and comprised a 22-game home-and-away season followed by a finals series featuring the top eight clubs. 

Before the season, the Port Adelaide Football Club (SANFL) was admitted to the league, increasing the South Australian membership to two clubs. Foundation club Fitzroy, which had gone into administration in 1996, merged with the Brisbane Bears to form a new Queensland-based club known as the Brisbane Lions. The Footscray Football Club changed its name to the Western Bulldogs. With these changes, the league's size remained at sixteen clubs.

The premiership was won by the Adelaide Football Club for the first time, after it defeated  by 31 points in the 1997 AFL Grand Final.

Premiership season

Round 1

Round 2

|- bgcolor="#CCCCFF"
| Home team
| Home team score
| Away team
| Away team score
| Ground
| Crowd
| Date
|- bgcolor="#FFFFFF"
||| 7.14 (56) |||| 24.19 (163) ||MCG|| 61,138 ||Friday 4, April
|- bgcolor="#FFFFFF"
||| 19.14 (128) |||| 15.10 (100) ||MCG|| 32,880 ||Saturday 5, April
|- bgcolor="#FFFFFF"
||| 11.12 (78) |||| 11.6 (72) ||Kardinia Park|| 17,988 ||Saturday 5, April
|- bgcolor="#FFFFFF"
||| 13.12 (90) |||| 12.11 (83) ||Princes Park|| 12,604 ||Saturday 5, April
|- bgcolor="#FFFFFF"
||| 23.16 (154) |||| 7.15 (57) ||Gabba|| 17,123 ||Sunday 6, April
|- bgcolor="#FFFFFF"
||| 8.12 (60) |||| 14.9 (93) ||Football Park|| 32,747 ||Sunday 6, April
|- bgcolor="#FFFFFF"
||| 13.9 (87) |||| 10.13 (73) ||Subiaco Oval|| 19,057 ||Sunday 6, April
|- bgcolor="#FFFFFF"
||| 12.14 (86) |||| 8.12 (60) ||MCG|| 38,170 ||Monday 7, April

Round 3

|- bgcolor="#CCCCFF"
| Home team
| Home team score
| Away team
| Away team score
| Ground
| Crowd
| Date
|- bgcolor="#FFFFFF"
||| 15.9 (99) |||| 14.7 (91) ||SCG|| 23,598 ||Friday 11, April
|- bgcolor="#FFFFFF"
||| 16.9 (105) |||| 12.14 (86) ||MCG|| 35,438 ||Saturday 12, April
|- bgcolor="#FFFFFF"
||| 19.11 (125) |||| 17.16 (118) ||Waverley Park|| 54,699 ||Saturday 12, April
|- bgcolor="#FFFFFF"
||| 18.21 (129) |||| 14.6 (90) ||Football Park|| 32,074 ||Saturday 12, April
|- bgcolor="#FFFFFF"
||| 18.14 (122) |||| 12.8 (80) ||MCG|| 57,978 ||Sunday 13, April
|- bgcolor="#FFFFFF"
||| 15.18 (108) |||| 12.8 (80) ||Princes Park|| 25,966 ||Sunday 13, April
|- bgcolor="#FFFFFF"
||| 12.15 (87) |||| 11.9 (75) ||Waverley Park|| 27,947 ||Sunday 13, April
|- bgcolor="#FFFFFF"
||| 16.15 (111) |||| 9.17 (71) ||Subiaco Oval|| 39,294 ||Sunday 13, April

Round 4

|- bgcolor="#CCCCFF"
| Home team
| Home team score
| Away team
| Away team score
| Ground
| Crowd
| Date
|- bgcolor="#FFFFFF"
||| 13.9 (87) |||| 13.11 (89) ||MCG|| 28,043 ||Friday 18, April
|- bgcolor="#FFFFFF"
||| 12.12 (84) |||| 15.11 (101) ||MCG|| 78,704 ||Saturday 19, April
|- bgcolor="#FFFFFF"
||| 10.12 (72) |||| 10.7 (67) ||Princes Park|| 15,461 ||Saturday 19, April
|- bgcolor="#FFFFFF"
||| 17.10 (112) |||| 13.10 (88) ||Subiaco Oval|| 38,222 ||Saturday 19, April
|- bgcolor="#FFFFFF"
||| 12.9 (81) |||| 18.19 (127) ||Waverley Park|| 35,061 ||Saturday 19, April
|- bgcolor="#FFFFFF"
||| 15.19 (109) |||| 12.11 (83) ||Gabba|| 18,575 ||Sunday 20, April
|- bgcolor="#FFFFFF"
||| 11.6 (72) |||| 11.17 (83) ||Football Park|| 47,256 ||Sunday 20, April
|- bgcolor="#FFFFFF"
||| 11.19 (85) |||| 11.12 (78) ||MCG|| 54,922 ||Sunday 20, April

Round 5

|- bgcolor="#CCCCFF"
| Home team
| Home team score
| Away team
| Away team score
| Ground
| Crowd
| Date
|- bgcolor="#FFFFFF"
||| 10.10 (70) |||| 14.15 (99) ||MCG|| 83,271 ||Friday 25, April
|- bgcolor="#FFFFFF"
||| 16.11 (107) |||| 15.11 (101) ||Subiaco Oval|| 23,504 ||Friday 25, April
|- bgcolor="#FFFFFF"
||| 12.6 (78) |||| 19.12 (126) ||MCG|| 19,655 ||Saturday 26, April
|- bgcolor="#FFFFFF"
||| 9.17 (71) |||| 19.7 (121) ||Princes Park|| 12,694 ||Saturday 26, April
|- bgcolor="#FFFFFF"
||| 15.9 (99) |||| 11.8 (74) ||Waverley Park|| 37,576 ||Saturday 26, April
|- bgcolor="#FFFFFF"
||| 10.13 (73) |||| 10.11 (71) ||Football Park|| 31,757 ||Sunday 27, April
|- bgcolor="#FFFFFF"
||| 21.15 (141) |||| 7.4 (46) ||MCG|| 44,449 ||Sunday 27, April
|- bgcolor="#FFFFFF"
||| 12.14 (86) |||| 13.16 (94) ||Princes Park|| 25,801 ||Sunday 27, April

Round 6

|- bgcolor="#CCCCFF"
| Home team
| Home team score
| Away team
| Away team score
| Ground
| Crowd
| Date
|- bgcolor="#FFFFFF"
||| 14.15 (99) |||| 17.11 (113) ||WACA|| 29,838 ||Friday 2, May
|- bgcolor="#FFFFFF"
||| 15.12 (102) |||| 9.17 (71) ||MCG|| 37,642 ||Saturday 3, May
|- bgcolor="#FFFFFF"
||| 13.6 (84) |||| 11.17 (83) ||Victoria Park|| 24,663 ||Saturday 3, May
|- bgcolor="#FFFFFF"
||| 14.13 (97) |||| 6.7 (43) ||Kardinia Park|| 16,467 ||Saturday 3, May
|- bgcolor="#FFFFFF"
||| 14.9 (93) |||| 16.7 (103) ||Waverley Park|| 38,953 ||Saturday 3, May
|- bgcolor="#FFFFFF"
||| 21.16 (142) |||| 11.17 (83) ||SCG|| 37,933 ||Sunday 4, May
|- bgcolor="#FFFFFF"
||| 17.19 (121) |||| 4.11 (35) ||Waverley Park|| 21,104 ||Sunday 4, May
|- bgcolor="#FFFFFF"
||| 19.8 (122) |||| 8.10 (58) ||Football Park|| 36,090 ||Sunday 4, May

Round 7

|- bgcolor="#CCCCFF"
| Home team
| Home team score
| Away team
| Away team score
| Ground
| Crowd
| Date
|- bgcolor="#FFFFFF"
||| 9.14 (68) |||| 17.9 (111) ||MCG|| 54,901 ||Friday 9, May
|- bgcolor="#FFFFFF"
||| 10.16 (76) |||| 14.14 (98) ||MCG|| 48,833 ||Saturday 10, May
|- bgcolor="#FFFFFF"
||| 19.19 (133) |||| 13.10 (88) ||Princes Park|| 18,860 ||Saturday 10, May
|- bgcolor="#FFFFFF"
||| 11.10 (76) |||| 6.8 (44) ||Kardinia Park|| 22,151 ||Saturday 10, May
|- bgcolor="#FFFFFF"
||| 17.22 (124) |||| 10.9 (69) ||WACA|| 18,198 ||Saturday 10, May
|- bgcolor="#FFFFFF"
||| 20.6 (126) |||| 8.13 (61) ||Waverley Park|| 17,752 ||Saturday 10, May
|- bgcolor="#FFFFFF"
||| 8.12 (60) |||| 21.13 (139) ||Gabba|| 17,524 ||Sunday 11, May
|- bgcolor="#FFFFFF"
||| 18.18 (126) |||| 11.7 (73) ||Football Park|| 39,275 ||Sunday 11, May

Round 8

|- bgcolor="#CCCCFF"
| Home team
| Home team score
| Away team
| Away team score
| Ground
| Crowd
| Date
|- bgcolor="#FFFFFF"
||| 19.15 (129) |||| 11.17 (83) ||MCG|| 61,014 ||Friday 16, May
|- bgcolor="#FFFFFF"
||| 7.7 (49) |||| 19.14 (128) ||MCG|| 28,989 ||Saturday 17, May
|- bgcolor="#FFFFFF"
||| 19.14 (128) |||| 15.10 (100) ||Princes Park|| 13,056 ||Saturday 17, May
|- bgcolor="#FFFFFF"
||| 22.12 (144) |||| 8.7 (55) ||Football Park|| 40,147 ||Saturday 17, May
|- bgcolor="#FFFFFF"
||| 14.16 (100) |||| 18.16 (124) ||MCG|| 51,928 ||Sunday 18, May
|- bgcolor="#FFFFFF"
||| 15.16 (106) |||| 12.9 (81) ||Princes Park|| 29,783 ||Sunday 18, May
|- bgcolor="#FFFFFF"
||| 14.14 (98) |||| 15.3 (93) ||Subiaco Oval|| 14,721 ||Sunday 18, May
|- bgcolor="#FFFFFF"
||| 18.11 (119) |||| 9.13 (67) ||MCG|| 26,721 ||Monday 19, May

Round 9

|- bgcolor="#CCCCFF"
| Home team
| Home team score
| Away team
| Away team score
| Ground
| Crowd
| Date
|- bgcolor="#FFFFFF"
||| 10.18 (78) |||| 3.9 (27) ||Football Park|| 32,958 ||Friday 23, May
|- bgcolor="#FFFFFF"
||| 16.9 (105) |||| 14.4 (88) ||Princes Park|| 18,187 ||Saturday 24, May
|- bgcolor="#FFFFFF"
||| 13.10 (88) |||| 14.18 (102) ||Waverley Park|| 23,463 ||Saturday 24, May
|- bgcolor="#FFFFFF"
||| 16.15 (111) |||| 11.8 (74) ||SCG|| 39,780 ||Saturday 24, May
|- bgcolor="#FFFFFF"
||| 19.12 (126) |||| 15.8 (98) ||Gabba|| 19,828 ||Sunday 25, May
|- bgcolor="#FFFFFF"
||| 16.14 (110) |||| 13.7 (85) ||Subiaco Oval|| 38,984 ||Sunday 25, May
|- bgcolor="#FFFFFF"
||| 16.7 (103) |||| 10.11 (71) ||MCG|| 29,307 ||Sunday 25, May
|- bgcolor="#FFFFFF"
||| 22.9 (141) |||| 14.10 (94) ||Waverley Park|| 52,257 ||Sunday 25, May

Round 10

|- bgcolor="#CCCCFF"
| Home team
| Home team score
| Away team
| Away team score
| Ground
| Crowd
| Date
|- bgcolor="#FFFFFF"
||| 14.9 (93) |||| 7.13 (55) ||Football Park|| 40,116 ||Friday 30, May
|- bgcolor="#FFFFFF"
||| 15.13 (103) |||| 9.4 (58) ||Princes Park|| 13,614 ||Saturday 31, May
|- bgcolor="#FFFFFF"
||| 16.12 (108) |||| 8.7 (55) ||Waverley Park|| 51,494 ||Saturday 31, May
|- bgcolor="#FFFFFF"
||| 16.11 (107) |||| 11.13 (79) ||Kardinia Park|| 22,731 ||Saturday 31, May
|- bgcolor="#FFFFFF"
||| 9.13 (67) |||| 14.8 (92) ||MCG|| 28,879 ||Saturday 31, May
|- bgcolor="#FFFFFF"
||| 17.12 (114) |||| 20.16 (136) ||MCG|| 50,138 ||Sunday 1, June
|- bgcolor="#FFFFFF"
||| 13.14 (92) |||| 13.11 (89) ||Gabba|| 20,403 ||Sunday 1, June
|- bgcolor="#FFFFFF"
||| 10.12 (72) |||| 16.9 (105) ||Subiaco Oval|| 22,464 ||Monday 2, June

Round 11

|- bgcolor="#CCCCFF"
| Home team
| Home team score
| Away team
| Away team score
| Ground
| Crowd
| Date
|- bgcolor="#FFFFFF"
||| 10.11 (71) |||| 11.11 (77) ||MCG|| 70,350 ||Friday 6, June
|- bgcolor="#FFFFFF"
||| 13.13 (91) |||| 17.22 (124) ||MCG|| 60,594 ||Saturday 7, June
|- bgcolor="#FFFFFF"
||| 14.12 (96) |||| 11.9 (75) ||Princes Park|| 24,897 ||Saturday 7, June
|- bgcolor="#FFFFFF"
||| 4.17 (41) |||| 10.16 (76) ||Football Park|| 35,669 ||Saturday 7, June
|- bgcolor="#FFFFFF"
||| 5.15 (45) |||| 14.13 (97) ||MCG|| 27,463 ||Sunday 8, June
|- bgcolor="#FFFFFF"
||| 11.7 (73) |||| 13.11 (89) ||Subiaco Oval|| 29,390 ||Sunday 8, June
|- bgcolor="#FFFFFF"
||| 15.15 (105) |||| 12.7 (79) ||MCG|| 20,585 ||Monday 9, June
|- bgcolor="#FFFFFF"
||| 12.12 (84) |||| 9.9 (63) ||Princes Park|| 27,904 ||Monday 9, June

Round 12

|- bgcolor="#CCCCFF"
| Home team
| Home team score
| Away team
| Away team score
| Ground
| Crowd
| Date
|- bgcolor="#FFFFFF"
||| 26.8 (164) |||| 16.14 (110) ||SCG|| 35,033 ||Friday 13, June
|- bgcolor="#FFFFFF"
||| 12.10 (82) |||| 14.10 (94) ||Princes Park|| 14,025 ||Saturday 14, June
|- bgcolor="#FFFFFF"
||| 7.13 (55) |||| 11.5 (71) ||Victoria Park|| 25,323 ||Saturday 14, June
|- bgcolor="#FFFFFF"
||| 12.10 (82) |||| 13.10 (88) ||Kardinia Park|| 22,871 ||Saturday 14, June
|- bgcolor="#FFFFFF"
||| 16.20 (116) |||| 12.13 (85) ||Waverley Park|| 44,883 ||Sunday 15, June
|- bgcolor="#FFFFFF"
||| 12.11 (83) |||| 16.9 (105) ||Football Park|| 43,345 ||Sunday 15, June
|- bgcolor="#FFFFFF"
||| 7.8 (50) |||| 21.9 (135) ||MCG|| 13,392 ||Sunday 15, June
|- bgcolor="#FFFFFF"
||| 24.13 (157) |||| 9.6 (60) ||Subiaco Oval|| 21,956 ||Sunday 15, June

Round 13

|- bgcolor="#CCCCFF"
| Home team
| Home team score
| Away team
| Away team score
| Ground
| Crowd
| Date
|- bgcolor="#FFFFFF"
||| 11.13 (79) |||| 12.14 (86) ||Subiaco Oval|| 37,854 ||Friday 27, June
|- bgcolor="#FFFFFF"
||| 4.10 (34) |||| 19.13 (127) ||MCG|| 58,812 ||Saturday 28, June
|- bgcolor="#FFFFFF"
||| 11.18 (84) |||| 15.11 (101) ||Waverley Park|| 32,370 ||Saturday 28, June
|- bgcolor="#FFFFFF"
||| 17.8 (110) |||| 7.12 (54) ||Kardinia Park|| 20,236 ||Saturday 28, June
|- bgcolor="#FFFFFF"
||| 11.22 (88) |||| 11.7 (73) ||Gabba|| 19,560 ||Saturday 28, June
|- bgcolor="#FFFFFF"
||| 10.9 (69) |||| 7.12 (54) ||Football Park|| 30,827 ||Saturday 28, June
|- bgcolor="#FFFFFF"
||| 17.16 (118) |||| 7.13 (55) ||Waverley Park|| 31,517 ||Sunday 29, June
|- bgcolor="#FFFFFF"
||| 8.17 (65) |||| 7.13 (55) ||SCG|| 30,160 ||Sunday 29, June

Round 14

|- bgcolor="#CCCCFF"
| Home team
| Home team score
| Away team
| Away team score
| Ground
| Crowd
| Date
|- bgcolor="#FFFFFF"
||| 16.10 (106) |||| 4.7 (31) ||Football Park|| 39,221 ||Friday 4, July
|- bgcolor="#FFFFFF"
||| 9.26 (80) |||| 10.12 (72) ||MCG|| 65,228 ||Saturday 5, July
|- bgcolor="#FFFFFF"
||| 11.8 (74) |||| 16.14 (110) ||Princes Park|| 32,183 ||Saturday 5, July
|- bgcolor="#FFFFFF"
||| 20.13 (133) |||| 11.13 (79) ||Waverley Park|| 32,635 ||Saturday 5, July
|- bgcolor="#FFFFFF"
||| 6.12 (48) |||| 3.15 (33) ||WACA|| 19,290 ||Saturday 5, July
|- bgcolor="#FFFFFF"
||| 18.12 (120) |||| 8.9 (57) ||MCG|| 44,803 ||Sunday 6, July
|- bgcolor="#FFFFFF"
||| 18.16 (124) |||| 13.14 (92) ||Waverley Park|| 29,886 ||Sunday 6, July
|- bgcolor="#FFFFFF"
||| 7.26 (68) |||| 7.8 (50) ||Gabba|| 19,155 ||Sunday 6, July

Round 15

|- bgcolor="#CCCCFF"
| Home team
| Home team score
| Away team
| Away team score
| Ground
| Crowd
| Date
|- bgcolor="#FFFFFF"
||| 14.8 (92) |||| 15.12 (102) ||MCG|| 45,120 ||Friday 11, July
|- bgcolor="#FFFFFF"
||| 18.11 (119) |||| 15.10 (100) ||MCG|| 27,992 ||Saturday 12, July
|- bgcolor="#FFFFFF"
||| 11.7 (73) |||| 21.11 (137) ||Princes Park|| 16,430 ||Saturday 12, July
|- bgcolor="#FFFFFF"
||| 25.10 (160) |||| 9.6 (60) ||Victoria Park|| 23,433 ||Saturday 12, July
|- bgcolor="#FFFFFF"
||| 10.16 (76) |||| 9.12 (66) ||Football Park|| 39,921 ||Saturday 12, July
|- bgcolor="#FFFFFF"
||| 11.13 (79) |||| 11.12 (78) ||SCG|| 36,077 ||Sunday 13, July
|- bgcolor="#FFFFFF"
||| 12.13 (85) |||| 9.13 (67) ||Subiaco Oval|| 29,723 ||Sunday 13, July
|- bgcolor="#FFFFFF"
||| 22.13 (145) |||| 10.9 (69) ||MCG|| 49,217 ||Sunday 13, July

Round 16

|- bgcolor="#CCCCFF"
| Home team
| Home team score
| Away team
| Away team score
| Ground
| Crowd
| Date
|- bgcolor="#FFFFFF"
||| 17.16 (118) |||| 13.9 (87) ||Gabba|| 21,348 ||Friday 18, July
|- bgcolor="#FFFFFF"
||| 25.15 (165) |||| 13.9 (87) ||MCG|| 58,512 ||Saturday 19, July
|- bgcolor="#FFFFFF"
||| 9.8 (62) |||| 20.21 (141) ||Waverley Park|| 43,181 ||Saturday 19, July
|- bgcolor="#FFFFFF"
||| 16.14 (110) |||| 12.6 (78) ||Kardinia Park|| 24,099 ||Saturday 19, July
|- bgcolor="#FFFFFF"
||| 15.22 (112) |||| 11.9 (75) ||SCG|| 39,318 ||Saturday 19, July
|- bgcolor="#FFFFFF"
||| 17.9 (111) |||| 8.10 (58) ||Football Park|| 37,790 ||Saturday 19, July
|- bgcolor="#FFFFFF"
||| 7.16 (58) |||| 17.12 (114) ||MCG|| 23,309 ||Sunday 20, July
|- bgcolor="#FFFFFF"
||| 15.7 (97) |||| 13.13 (91) ||Subiaco Oval|| 18,392 ||Sunday 20, July

Round 17

|- bgcolor="#CCCCFF"
| Home team
| Home team score
| Away team
| Away team score
| Ground
| Crowd
| Date
|- bgcolor="#FFFFFF"
||| 10.12 (72) |||| 18.14 (122) ||MCG|| 33,076 ||Friday 25, July
|- bgcolor="#FFFFFF"
||| 7.16 (58) |||| 14.12 (96) ||Princes Park|| 27,689 ||Saturday 26, July
|- bgcolor="#FFFFFF"
||| 9.8 (62) |||| 10.11 (71) ||Waverley Park|| 15,939 ||Saturday 26, July
|- bgcolor="#FFFFFF"
||| 22.17 (149) |||| 7.10 (52) ||SCG|| 32,534 ||Saturday 26, July
|- bgcolor="#FFFFFF"
||| 29.11 (185) |||| 7.6 (48) ||Football Park|| 36,297 ||Saturday 26, July
|- bgcolor="#FFFFFF"
||| 12.20 (92) |||| 5.14 (44) ||Waverley Park|| 34,859 ||Sunday 27, July
|- bgcolor="#FFFFFF"
||| 20.14 (134) |||| 12.10 (82) ||MCG|| 37,779 ||Sunday 27, July
|- bgcolor="#FFFFFF"
||| 20.9 (129) |||| 12.10 (82) ||Subiaco Oval|| 34,565 ||Sunday 27, July

Round 18

|- bgcolor="#CCCCFF"
| Home team
| Home team score
| Away team
| Away team score
| Ground
| Crowd
| Date
|- bgcolor="#FFFFFF"
||| 11.17 (83) |||| 8.16 (64) ||MCG|| 38,614 ||Friday 1, August
|- bgcolor="#FFFFFF"
||| 7.11 (53) |||| 25.19 (169) ||MCG|| 26,901 ||Saturday 2, August
|- bgcolor="#FFFFFF"
||| 17.13 (115) |||| 15.10 (100) ||Princes Park|| 18,373 ||Saturday 2, August
|- bgcolor="#FFFFFF"
||| 25.9 (159) |||| 11.8 (74) ||Kardinia Park|| 21,867 ||Saturday 2, August
|- bgcolor="#FFFFFF"
||| 21.15 (141) |||| 11.5 (71) ||Gabba|| 19,635 ||Saturday 2, August
|- bgcolor="#FFFFFF"
||| 18.19 (127) |||| 13.8 (86) ||Football Park|| 42,548 ||Sunday 3, August
|- bgcolor="#FFFFFF"
||| 12.17 (89) |||| 15.21 (111) ||MCG|| 68,036 ||Sunday 3, August
|- bgcolor="#FFFFFF"
||| 7.7 (49) |||| 13.4 (82) ||Subiaco Oval|| 39,711 ||Sunday 3, August

Round 19

|- bgcolor="#CCCCFF"
| Home team
| Home team score
| Away team
| Away team score
| Ground
| Crowd
| Date
|- bgcolor="#FFFFFF"
||| 17.14 (116) |||| 9.5 (59) ||MCG|| 27,021 ||Friday 8, August
|- bgcolor="#FFFFFF"
||| 14.23 (107) |||| 13.13 (91) ||MCG|| 61,650 ||Saturday 9, August
|- bgcolor="#FFFFFF"
||| 14.18 (102) |||| 9.10 (64) ||Princes Park|| 13,058 ||Saturday 9, August
|- bgcolor="#FFFFFF"
||| 10.6 (66) |||| 13.9 (87) ||Waverley Park|| 20,517 ||Saturday 9, August
|- bgcolor="#FFFFFF"
||| 12.13 (85) |||| 5.12 (42) ||WACA|| 15,757 ||Saturday 9, August
|- bgcolor="#FFFFFF"
||| 17.17 (119) |||| 18.20 (128) ||SCG|| 39,287 ||Sunday 10, August
|- bgcolor="#FFFFFF"
||| 11.7 (73) |||| 9.14 (68) ||MCG|| 53,901 ||Sunday 10, August
|- bgcolor="#FFFFFF"
||| 9.4 (58) |||| 9.11 (65) ||Football Park|| 45,498 ||Sunday 10, August

Round 20

|- bgcolor="#CCCCFF"
| Home team
| Home team score
| Away team
| Away team score
| Ground
| Crowd
| Date
|- bgcolor="#FFFFFF"
||| 15.7 (97) |||| 7.17 (59) ||WACA|| 21,164 ||Friday 15, August
|- bgcolor="#FFFFFF"
||| 13.13 (91) |||| 12.9 (81) ||MCG|| 50,944 ||Saturday 16, August
|- bgcolor="#FFFFFF"
||| 12.5 (77) |||| 9.10 (64) ||Waverley Park|| 26,201 ||Saturday 16, August
|- bgcolor="#FFFFFF"
||| 13.17 (95) |||| 9.13 (67) ||Kardinia Park|| 23,007 ||Saturday 16, August
|- bgcolor="#FFFFFF"
||| 13.15 (93) |||| 13.15 (93) ||Gabba|| 20,835 ||Saturday 16, August
|- bgcolor="#FFFFFF"
||| 20.15 (135) |||| 11.11 (77) ||SCG|| 34,111 ||Sunday 17, August
|- bgcolor="#FFFFFF"
||| 14.13 (97) |||| 14.12 (96) ||MCG|| 29,620 ||Sunday 17, August
|- bgcolor="#FFFFFF"
||| 7.18 (60) |||| 16.7 (103) ||Football Park|| 39,632 ||Sunday 17, August

Round 21

|- bgcolor="#CCCCFF"
| Home team
| Home team score
| Away team
| Away team score
| Ground
| Crowd
| Date
|- bgcolor="#FFFFFF"
||| 8.14 (62) |||| 17.12 (114) ||MCG|| 32,935 ||Friday 22, August
|- bgcolor="#FFFFFF"
||| 10.21 (81) |||| 6.7 (43) ||MCG|| 26,393 ||Saturday 23, August
|- bgcolor="#FFFFFF"
||| 11.10 (76) |||| 5.11 (41) ||Princes Park|| 27,375 ||Saturday 23, August
|- bgcolor="#FFFFFF"
||| 12.14 (86) |||| 10.8 (68) ||Whitten Oval|| 26,704 ||Saturday 23, August
|- bgcolor="#FFFFFF"
||| 15.12 (102) |||| 16.10 (106) ||Gabba|| 21,065 ||Saturday 23, August
|- bgcolor="#FFFFFF"
||| 22.14 (146) |||| 8.13 (61) ||MCG|| 22,516 ||Sunday 24, August
|- bgcolor="#FFFFFF"
||| 9.14 (68) |||| 14.16 (100) ||Subiaco Oval|| 28,751 ||Sunday 24, August
|- bgcolor="#FFFFFF"
||| 6.12 (48) |||| 5.9 (39) ||Football Park|| 37,661 ||Monday 25, August

Round 22

|- bgcolor="#CCCCFF"
| Home team
| Home team score
| Away team
| Away team score
| Ground
| Crowd
| Date
|- bgcolor="#FFFFFF"
||| 18.12 (120) |||| 11.15 (81) ||WACA|| 29,402 ||Friday 29, August
|- bgcolor="#FFFFFF"
||| 18.11 (119) |||| 11.13 (79) ||MCG|| 15,036 ||Saturday 30, August
|- bgcolor="#FFFFFF"
||| 13.11 (89) |||| 13.13 (91) ||Princes Park|| 34,922 ||Saturday 30, August
|- bgcolor="#FFFFFF"
||| 13.9 (87) |||| 15.15 (105) ||Waverley Park|| 35,706 ||Saturday 30, August
|- bgcolor="#FFFFFF"
||| 13.12 (90) |||| 15.10 (100) ||SCG|| 46,168 ||Saturday 30, August
|- bgcolor="#FFFFFF"
||| 18.14 (122) |||| 15.21 (111) ||MCG|| 43,660 ||Sunday 31, August
|- bgcolor="#FFFFFF"
||| 16.6 (102) |||| 14.14 (98) ||Princes Park|| 25,636 ||Sunday 31, August
|- bgcolor="#FFFFFF"
||| 12.12 (84) |||| 17.15 (117) ||Football Park|| 38,589 ||Sunday 31, August

Ladder

Ladder progression

Finals series

Week one

Week two

Week three

Week four

Attendance

Notable events
The last AFL game at Whitten Oval was played.
 finished on top of the ladder (prior to the finals) to claim the minor premiership, despite losing 7 matches in the home and away season. No team before or since has finished on top with that many losses, which highlights the evenness of the 1997 season.  would also play in their first preliminary final since 1972 and reach their first grand final since 1971.
This meant that it was played at the same time as the fourth qualifying final between minor premiers  and the Brisbane Lions, who were competing in their first season as a merged entity. The game is also notable for being the first ever final between two non-Victorian teams.
A finals abnormality in the second week saw  and  host their semi final matches at their home venues, despite both playing against higher ranked opponents. The finals system was reviewed and altered in season 2000, preventing this from occurring again in week 2.
Gary Ablett Sr., arguably one of the games best and most well known players, officially announced his retirement during the Preliminary Final weekend. Ablett failed to play a game in 1997 due to a knee injury.

References

External links

See also
 1997 AFL Grand Final

 
AFL season
Australian Football League seasons